The Institute of Higher International Studies (commonly referred to as "IHEI") is a public institution of research and higher education in Paris, France. It was founded in 1921 by Paul Fauchille and  Albert de Lapradelle. It is now affiliated to Panthéon-Assas University.

Notable people
Alejandro Álvarez
Prosper Weil
Boris Mirkin-Getzevich
Assad Kotaite

References

External links
Official website

Paris 2 Panthéon-Assas University
Research institutes of international relations
Schools of international relations
Schools in Paris
Educational institutions established in 1921
1921 establishments in France